El Palmar is a village and the most populated district in Murcia, Spain. It is part of the municipality of Murcia. 24,266 people resided in the territory in 2020.

There are two hypotheses about the district name. According to the first one, the name is due to the presence of palm trees and European fan palms. The other hypothesis consists in El Palomar phrase, which appears in historic documents of the 16th century, as the origin of the toponym.

Geography 
This territory is located in the foothill of the mountain pass Puerto de la Cadena. There is distance of 5 km from El Palmar to the capital of the municipality (the city of Murcia).

History 
There is evidence about the Roman presence in this territory in the Roman Hispanian era. The evidence consists in archaeological remains of a Roman hamlet whose date is the 2nd century BC.

During the Middle Ages a castle named La Asomada was built in the 12th century.

There was an increase in the population in the 17th century. As a consequence, the locality obtained the status of the villa.

As the Spanish Constitution of 1812 came into effect, the current district obtained the own municipality. When the king Ferdinand VII recovered the crown, the independence was removed. The district recovered the own municipality during the Trienio Liberal (1820–1823). When the period ended El Palmar started to belong to Murcia again.

Demographics 
18.22% inhabitants are foreigners – 1.72% come from another European country, 13.72% are Africans, 2.3% are Americans, and 0.47% are Asians. The table below shows the population trends of the territory.

Main sights 

 La Asomada castle: it consists in ruins of a former castle. It was probably built in the 12th century.
 Los Bernal modernist building: it was built in the early 20th century.
 Bernal Theatre: it was constructed in 1910 and restored in 2003.

Notable people 

 Carlos Alcaraz (b. 2003) – professional tennis player

References

Murcia
Populated places in the Region of Murcia